is a Japanese musician, singer-songwriter guitarist born of a Japanese mother and Spanish Filipino father.

Career
Born in Japan, raised in Philippines

DURAN was heavily influenced by his father, who was a bassist, as well as musicians Jimi Hendrix , Led Zeppelin, Prince. At age 3, DURAN started learning piano and by 14, he learned to play the guitar.

By 2009, he was member of a street musicians band known as The Rootless. He performed with them until 2013. He was also member of the bands a flood of circle, Made in Asia.
He has also worked with artists such as Koshi Inaba (B’z), Shikao Suga, Kiyoharu and Exile Atsushi. With Atsushi, together with Fuyu and Phekoo, he contributes in the band Red Diamond Dogs, which Atsushi had created for his solo career, after Exile's hiatus in 2016.

In November 2017, DURAN made his official solo debut, with the release of his first album, Face, which features artists Shikao Suga, Kiyoharu and Katsuma (coldrain) as guests.

Discography

Albums
 Face (2017)
 Kaleido Garden (2021)

Singles
 Ride 4 me (2019, digital)
 Black & White / The World Is A Gimmick (2019, venue-limited physical CD)
 Sampaguita (March 23, 2020)
 Echo (Electric Gospel) (June 29, 2020)
 No In Between (feat. Mars Daniel, Southeast!) (August 16, 2020)
TWIAG_2 (feat. 906) (November 8, 2020)
Phantasmagoria (December 22, 2020)
Revive feat. Katsuma (coldrain) (August 25, 2021)
No In Between (September 22, 2021)
Leavin' It All Behind feat. 906 (October 20, 2021)
Shades Of Night (June 15, 2022)
Zankon (Devil Talkin' Blues) (July 12, 2022)
Real Eyes (December 29, 2022, 7 inch vinyl)

Other recordings
 Okay (single) (2020, collaboration with Yoshito Tanaka)
 love letter (single) (2022, collaboration with Tatsuro (mucc) produced by ken (L'Arc〜en〜Ciel)

Stage
 Hedwig and the Angry Inch (musical) (August 31 till September 29, 2019, several venues), as part of the band "The angry inch".

References

External links
 Official website 

Living people
Japanese male singer-songwriters
Japanese singer-songwriters
Japanese guitarists
Japanese people of Filipino descent
1984 births